Gader Valley is a long valley in the Greater Fatra Range  in Central Slovakia. It is accessible from the village of Blatnica. The valley is the gateway to the peaks of Tlstá and Ostrá. Its upper part, from the merger with the Selenec Valley, is named Dedošová. In Gader Valley, there are almost all of the protected species of animals and plants that occur throughout the Great Fatra: 3,000 species of invertebrates, 110 species of birds, and 60 mammalian species. The Tlstá mountain complex was declared a National Nature Reserve in 1972. 
 About 2 km from the village of Blatnica are the ruins of Blatnica Castle, which dates back to the 13th century. It is located on the low limestone ridge of Plešovice (658 m above sea level), which separates the Gaderská valley from the Turčianska basin. There is a popular hiking trail from Blatnica Castle that leads through the valley.

References

Valleys of Slovakia
Veľká Fatra